General-purpose modeling (GPM) is the systematic use of a general-purpose modeling language to represent the various facets of an object or a system. Examples of GPM languages are:
 The Unified Modeling Language (UML), an industry standard for modeling software-intensive systems
 EXPRESS, a data modeling language for product data, standardized as ISO 10303-11
 IDEF, a group of languages from the 1970s that aimed to be neutral, generic and reusable
 Gellish, an industry standard natural language oriented modeling language for storage and exchange of data and knowledge, published in 2005
 XML, a data modeling language now beginning to be used to model code (MetaL, Microsoft .Net )

GPM languages are in contrast with domain-specific modeling languages (DSMs).

See also
Model-driven engineering (MDE)

Specification languages
Modeling languages